Tom "Tommy" Floyd (born 7 October 1960) is a former Australian rules footballer who played with Geelong and Collingwood in the Victorian Football League (VFL).

Floyd played seven games in 1978, aged only 17, but didn't appear at all in the 1979 VFL season. He had his best year at Geelong in 1980 when he played 22 games, the last of which was a preliminary final. During the season he averaged just under 20 disposals a game and was Geelong's third most prolific goal-kicker with 25 goals. A rover, he was a member of Geelong's reserves premiership team in 1981.

Midway through the 1982 season, Floyd crossed over to Collingwood but would only spend one more year at the club.

He held the position of Head of Boarding at Mazenod College in Western Australia from 2015-2021.

References

1960 births
Australian rules footballers from Victoria (Australia)
Geelong Football Club players
Collingwood Football Club players
North Shore Football Club (GFL) players
Living people